The minor epauletted fruit bat (Epomophorus minor) is a species of megabat in the family Pteropodidae. It is found in Zambia, Tanzania, Mozambique and Kenya.

References

Epomophorus
Mammals described in 1879
Bats of Africa
Taxa named by George Edward Dobson